Halas lace is a type of needle lace. It first appeared in 1902 in the town of Kiskunhalas, Hungary, colloquially known as "Halas". The lace was typically soft orange, pale green and yellow in colouring. Arpad Dekani and Maria Markovits are credited with developing Halas lace. Initially, Dekani did all of the design work while Markovits executed the designs.

References

Needle lace